Pseudoeuraphia is a genus of star barnacles in the family Chthamalidae. There is one described species in Pseudoeuraphia, P. montgomeryi.

References

Barnacles